Imra (Kamkata-vari: Imro) was the chief creator deity of the Nuristani people before their conversion to Islam. Imra was believed to be the creator of the earth. With his breath, it was believed, he created the three other main deities of the pantheon: Mon, Gish and Bagisht.

Etymology
The name of the deity is considered a reflex of Indo-Iranian Yama. The name Imro or Yum in Kamkata-vari is thought to derive from a borrowing of Sanskrit Yama-rāja "King Yama" via a Middle Indo-Aryan form *Yam(a)rāy(a) with the characteristic northwestern sound change of j to y.<ref>Allen, Nicholas Justin. "Some gods of Pre-Islamic Nuristan". In: Revue de l'histoire des religions, tome 208, n°2, 1991. Histoire des religions et comparatisme: la question indo-européenne. pp. 141-168. [DOI: https://doi.org/10.3406/rhr.1991.1679]; 
www.persee.fr/doc/rhr_0035-1423_1991_num_208_2_1679</ref>Halfmann, Jakob. "Nuristani Theonyms in Light of Historical Phonology". In: 6th Indo-European Research Colloquium, 2022. [DOI: http://dx.doi.org/10.13140/RG.2.2.31805.54244]; www.researchgate.net/publication/359109254_Nuristani_Theonyms_in_Light_of_Historical_Phonology It is likely a cognate of the Bangani title Jim Raza 'god of the dead'. He is also known as Mara "Killer, Death", a term derived from the Prasun language.Cacopardo, A.S. (2016). "A World In-between. The Pre-Islamic Cultures of the Hindu Kush". In: Pellò, S.(ed.). Borders. Itineraries on the Edges of Iran. Venezia, Eurasiatica Quaderni di studi su Balcani, Anatolia, Iran, Caucaso e Asia Centrale. Edizioni Ca' Foscari. pp. 251 and 253.  [DOI: 10.14277/6969-100-3/EUR-5-10]

Cognates of Kamkata-vari imro are found in other neighboring languages: Waigali yamrai, Kalash (Urtsun) imbro, Ashkun imra and Prasun yumr'a'' - all referring to a "creator god".

Role in religion
This deity also acts as the guardian to the gates of hell (located in a subterranean realm), preventing the return to the world of the living - a motif that echoes the role of Yama as the king of the underworld.

Popular culture

In John Updike's 1965 short story "God Speaks" (collected in "Museums and Women") Gish Imra is the name of one of the protagonists, the son of the assassinated leader of a Central Asian state called Nuristan.

See also
Moni
Great Gish
Yomi

References

Indo-European deities
Asian gods
Creator gods